Western Condors, is a semi-professional soccer club, based and located in the Smithfield area of New South Wales.

The club was founded in 1983 by Chilean migrants and is formerly known as The New Chilean Football Club and has competed in the NSW Premier League system since 1985.

Senior Team History 
In 2017, Western Condors played in NSW State League

In 2018, Western Condors finished 7th with 26 competition points, missing the finals by 9 points.

In season 2019, they lasted compete in the NSW State League competition.

Honours

Notes and references

External links 
|Westerm Condors Website
|State League Competition Website

1983 establishments in Australia
Association football clubs established in 1983
Soccer clubs in New South Wales